Woodlawn Memorial Gardens is a cemetery located in Norfolk, Virginia, USA. Established as a private, family owned cemetery in 1958, Woodlawn Memorial Gardens encompasses seventy-five acres of land, 40 of which are undeveloped, at the Norfolk and Virginia Beach borders in Southeastern Virginia adjacent to Virginia Beach Boulevard and Newtown Road. Woodlawn has seventeen gardens including three Veteran's sections, a large community mausoleum, two semi-private mausoleums, an Orthodox Jewish section, and private family compounds.

List of gardens 
Babyland
Garden of Meditation
Garden of Christus
Avenue of States
Avenue of History
Avenue of Flags
Garden of St. Luke
Garden of The Ten Commandments
Masonic Garden
Garden of Faith
Garden of Devotion
Garden of Peace
Garden of Life
Garden of The Apostles
Garden of Serenity 
Chinese Garden
Garden of King David
Meditation Estates - Cremation and Traditional Burial - Hedge & Walled Estates
Eternal Light Mausoleum 
Good Shepherd Mausoleum 
Reflection Estates

Notable burials 

Master Chief Petty Officer (Master Diver) Carl Brashear
Rear Admiral Robert E. Dixon
Gunnery Sergeant Carlos Hathcock
Noel Franklin Major
Vice Admiral Edmund B. Taylor

External links
Woodlawn Memorial Gardens

Cemeteries in Norfolk, Virginia
1958 establishments in Virginia